Sigfús Eymundsson (1837–1911) was an Icelandic photographer and bookseller.
He practiced bookbinding from a young age and in 1857 he went to Copenhagen to study the profession. In 1861 he went to Norway where he studied photography. He then operated a studio in Copenhagen for a year and a half before moving back to Iceland in 1866. In 1867 he opened the first commercial studio in Reykjavík. He also founded the Eymundsson bookstore and published a number
of books.

References
Inga Lára Baldvinsdóttir. "Iceland", Photography Encyclopedia. http://www.answers.com/topic/iceland?cat=travel
"Sigfús Eymundsson bóksali", Óðinn, March 1907. http://www.timarit.is/?issueID=302351&pageSelected=0&lang=0

1837 births
1911 deaths
Sigfus Eymundsson